Moszczanka may refer to the following places:
Moszczanka, Greater Poland Voivodeship (west-central Poland)
Moszczanka, Lublin Voivodeship (east Poland)
Moszczanka, Opole Voivodeship (south-west Poland)